Kande is an undocumented Bantu language of Gabon.

References

Tsogo languages